iBario was an internet marketing conglomerate based in Israel.

It is estimated by industry experts that iBario was worth approximately $100 million in 2014. iBario requested to be removed from Google search results in 2012 and 2013, due to copyright infringement. iBario has not been active since 2015.

History
Founded in 2010 by five founders, iBario, was a privately owned and funded company. The company focused on product diversification and branched out in various different industries including cooking,  software and gaming. While active, iBario was considered to be one of the world's largest internet marketing platforms.

With 60 employees at its peak, iBario operated from a modest industrial building in Or Yehuda and was estimated by industry experts to be worth around $100 million. According to estimates in 2014, iBario had an annual turnover of $90 million and a net revenue of more than $10 million.

iBario was one of the biggest Google Adwords buyers in Israel and Europe and was a well-known partner of Google.

Business model
As a privately owned and funded company, iBario received the majority of its funding from advertisements. The company ran their own advertising network, RevenueHits, which served advertisements to users on iBario sites. It works with other advertising networks in Israeli, namely Matomy Media Group and Marimedia. It also allowed users to run controlled test on the various marketing communication channels.

Revenue generation
iBario generated revenue from the development of PC maintenance products and the distribution of its software. They acquired brands like PerformerSoft, BeGamer and Slovak Studio.

iBario's biggest revenue generator was the free software installation engine InstallBrain. Studies estimated that iBario had at one point produced 50% of its revenue, a figure that had declined to approximately 20% due to the limited ability of toolbars to override the search engine settings of users.

RevenueHits, iBario's sister company, was estimated to account 30-40% of their overall revenue.

Popularity
At its peak, iBario's websites saw millions of unique monthly visitors. Softtango, iBario's download site which brings in approximately 25 million downloads per month, was at one point the fourth largest download site in the world. Other notable websites include:
Mayajo, iBario's recipe site has brought in more web traffic as compared to well-known websites such as Recipe.com and BigOven.
Speedanalysis.com, a site which helps check users’ online speed connection is raking in 100 million unique visitors each month

References

External links

Israeli companies established in 2010
Privately held companies of Israel